Monoxenous development, or monoxeny, characterizes a parasite whose development is restricted to a single host species.

In a monoxenous life cycle, the parasitic species may be strictly host specific (using only a single host species, such as gregarines) or not (e.g. Eimeria, Coccidia).

References

External links
 xeno-, xen- word info

Parasitism